Charlie Brown Jr. ao Vivo (Portuguese for "Charlie Brown Jr. Live") is the first DVD by Brazilian alternative rock band Charlie Brown Jr. It came out in 2002 through EMI and originally recorded at a gig at the DirecTV Music Hall in São Paulo, later to be broadcast by direct broadcast satellite service provider DirecTV. As extras, the DVD contains the original music videos for "Rubão, o Dono do Mundo", "Não Deixe o Mar te Engolir", "Confisco" and "Hoje Eu Acordei Feliz"; interviews with the bandmembers; backstage footage; pictures of the show; and an extensive making-of.

It sold over 71,000 copies and received a Double Platinum certification by Pro-Música Brasil in 2004.

Track listing
"Rubão, o Dono do Mundo"
"Tudo Mudar"
"Quebra-Mar"
"Beatbox"
"Confisco"
"Tudo que Ela Gosta de Escutar"
"Quinta-Feira"
"Hoje Eu Acordei Feliz"
"Do Surfe"
"Pra Mais Tarde Fazermos a Cabeça"
"Zóio de Lula"
"Ouviu-se Falar"
"União"
"T.F.D.P."
"Sino Dourado"
"O Côro Vai Comê!"
"Gimme o Anel"
"Te Levar"
"Como Tudo Deve Ser"
"Lugar ao Sol"
"Não É Sério"
"Proibida pra Mim (Grazon)"
"Não Deixe o Mar te Engolir"

Personnel
 Chorão – vocals, guitar on "T.F.D.P."
 Champignon – bass guitar, backing vocals, beatboxing
 Marcão – guitars
 Renato Pelado – drums

References

2002 video albums
Live video albums
2002 live albums
EMI Group live albums
EMI Group video albums
Charlie Brown Jr. albums
Portuguese-language live albums